The Miss Perú 2003 pageant was held on April 29, 2003. That year, 38 candidates were competing for the national crown. The chosen winner represented Peru at the Miss World 2003. The Miss Universo Perú was chosen midway through the Miss Peru contest in a Gala de Belleza show, and would enter in Miss Universe 2003. The Miss Earth Perú would enter in Miss Earth 2003. The first runner up would enter in Miss Intercontinental 2003. The rest of the finalists would enter in different pageants.

Placements

Special Awards

 Best Regional Costume - Cuzco - Aldana García
 Miss Photogenic - Apurímac - Paula Ángeles Ramirez
 Miss Elegance - Pomabamba - Karla Tarazona
 Miss Body - San Martín - Ivette Santa María
 Best Hair - Cuzco - Aldana García Jahnsen
 Miss Congeniality - Surco - María Paz González-Vigil
 Miss Internet - Piura - Claudia Hernández
 Most Beautiful Face - Amazonas - Diana Goytizolo

Delegates

Amazonas - Diana Goytizolo
Áncash - Karen Herrera
Apurímac - Paula Ángeles
Arequipa - Claudia Ortiz de Zevallos
Ayacucho - Ericka Canales
Cajamarca - Zuleira Cantera
Callao - Melissa Granda Velarde
Chiclayo- Fiorella Paredes Vásquez
Cono Norte - Sofía Urteaga
Cuzco - Aldana García Jahnsen
Distrito Capital - Danitza Autero Stanic
Huancavelica - Fabiola Beckmann
Huancayo - Katia Osorio
Huánuco - Rosvith Rivera Huamán
Ica - Tania Pérez Escalante
Jauja - Ma. Cristina Ávila Loayza
Junín - Carla Ribero Sotomayor
La Libertad - Giselle Vásquez

La Punta - Marcela Granda Alegre
Lambayeque - Viviana López
Loreto  - Libni Landaeta
Mollendo - Fátima Zimic
Moquegua - Sandra Salazar
Moyobamba - Karol Ortiz Navarro
Pacasmayo - Juliana Quiroz
Pasco - Paula Mauralogoitia
Pisco - Pamela Silva Roldán
Piura - Claudia Hernández Oré
Pomabamba - Karla Tarazona
San Isidro - Natalia Urrunaga
San Martín - Ivette Santa María
Surco - María Paz González-Vigil
Tacna - Yolanda Raygada
Tarapoto - Zayra Díaz
Tumbes - Clara Seminaria Caldas
Ucayali - Carla Yacila

References

External links
Miss Peru 2003 video
Miss Peru 2003

Miss Peru
2003 in Peru
2003 beauty pageants